Thunder Riders is a 1928 American silent Western film directed by William Wyler and starring Ted Wells, Charlotte Stevens and William Steele. The film's sets were designed by the art director David S. Garber.

Cast
 Ted Wells as Jack Duncan 
 Charlotte Stevens as Betty Barton 
 William Steele as Lem Dawson 
 William J. Dyer as Lon Seeright 
 Leo White as Prof. Wilfred Winkle 
 Julia Griffith as Cythia Straight 
 Bob Burns as Sheriff 
 Gilbert Holmes as Rider 
 Richard L'Estrange as Rider

References

Bibliography
 Langman, Larry. A Guide to Silent Westerns. Greenwood Publishing Group, 1992.

External links
 

1928 films
1928 Western (genre) films
American black-and-white films
Films directed by William Wyler
Universal Pictures films
Silent American Western (genre) films
1920s English-language films
1920s American films